César M'Boma (born 18 February 1979) is a Cameroonian former professional football forward.

References

External links
 
 
 

Living people
1979 births
Cameroonian footballers
Association football forwards
FC Sion players
VfL Bochum II players
SSV Jahn Regensburg players
Chemnitzer FC players
VfL Wolfsburg II players
SV Waldhof Mannheim players
FC Oberneuland players
TuS Koblenz players
2. Bundesliga players
Liga 1 (Indonesia) players
Persitara Jakarta Utara players
Football Bourg-en-Bresse Péronnas 01 players
SG Sonnenhof Großaspach players